Scott Lee may refer to:

Scott Lee (canoeist) (born 1949), Canadian canoeist
Scott Lee (footballer) (born 1963), Australian rules footballer
Jason Scott Lee (born 1966), American actor 
Lisa Scott-Lee (born 1975), Welsh singer
Andy Scott-Lee (born 1980), Welsh singer